Shout! is the tenth studio album by American rock band Gov't Mule. The album was released on September 24, 2013. The album is in a two-CD format. The first CD contains songs with Gov't Mule's Warren Haynes as vocalist. The second disc contains the same songs in a slightly different order, each track featuring a different guest vocalist. The album features guest appearances from Ben Harper, Elvis Costello, Dr. John, Jim James, Grace Potter, Toots Hibbert, Glenn Hughes, Ty Taylor, Dave Matthews, Myles Kennedy, and Steve Winwood.

Critical reception

PopMatters journalist Neil Kelly said "Shout! has Gov't Mule showing the highest respect to all forms of classic roots, as is the case with arguably all of their studio efforts." David Fricke of Rolling Stone wrote "Gov't Mule, led by singer-guitarist Warren Haynes, write solid rock songs in the power-blues, heroic-vocal tradition of Free and Led Zeppelin." Thom Jurek from AllMusic stated "Shout! would have been better served if the best of the guest performances were integrated into the formal album. For fans, the first disc has plenty of exciting material to offer: it sounds great, the writing is excellent, there are new musical directions, and, as expected, there is terrific playing throughout."

Commercial performance
The album debuted at number 32 on the Billboard 200 chart, with first-week sales of 14,120 copies in the United States. On the Billboard Top Rock Albums chart it peaked at number 11.

Track listing

Charts

References

Gov't Mule albums
2013 albums
Blue Note Records albums